Alloways Creek Friends Meetinghouse (also called Hancock's Bridge Friends Meetinghouse and Lower Alloways Creek Friends Meetinghouse) is a historic Quaker meeting house on Buttonwood Avenue, 150 feet west of Main Street in the Hancock's Bridge section of Lower Alloways Creek Township in Salem County, New Jersey, United States. It was built in 1756 and documented by the Historic American Buildings Survey. It was later added to the National Register of Historic Places on December 18, 2003, for its significance in architecture.

History and description
The first meeting house for the Alloways Creek Meeting was built on the bank of  Alloway Creek in 1685. The second was built in 1718. The third was built here in 1756 on land donated by William Hancock. An addition was constructed in 1784, adding a second story. The building is constructed of brick featuring Flemish bond.

See also
 National Register of Historic Places listings in Salem County, New Jersey
 List of the oldest buildings in New Jersey

References

External links
 
 

Quaker meeting houses in New Jersey
Churches on the National Register of Historic Places in New Jersey
Churches completed in 1756
Churches in Salem County, New Jersey
National Register of Historic Places in Salem County, New Jersey
New Jersey Register of Historic Places
Historic American Buildings Survey in New Jersey
Lower Alloways Creek Township, New Jersey
18th-century Quaker meeting houses